Events from the year 1904 in Italy.

Kingdom of Italy
Monarch – Victor Emmanuel III (1900–1946)
Prime Minister – Giovanni Giolitti (1903–1905)
Population – 33,237,000

Events
The Giolittian Era. During his second and third tenure as Prime Minister (1903–1905 and 1906–1909), Giovanni Giolitti courts the left and labour unions with social legislation, including subsidies for low-income housing, preferential government contracts for worker cooperatives, and old age and disability pensions. Economic expansion was secured by monetary stability, moderate protectionism and government support of production. Foreign trade doubled between 1900 and 1910, wages rose, and the general standard of living went up. Nevertheless, the period was also marked by a sharp increase in the frequency and duration of industrial action, with major labour strikes.

February
 February 17 – The opera Madama Butterfly by Giacomo Puccini, premieres at La Scala in Milan. It was withdrawn after a disastrous premiere and Puccini substantially rewrote it.

April
 April 24 – Official visit of French President Émile Loubet to Rome.

July
 July 4 – Piero Ginori Conti tests the first-ever geothermal power generator at the Larderello dry steam field in Italy. It was a small generator that lit four light bulbs.

September
 Series of strikes, including a general strike in September. Prime Minister Giovanni Giolitti refuses to intervene and this attitude prevents the movement to take revolutionary dimensions. Pope Pius X gives tacit permission to Catholic candidates to stand in parliamentary to counter the red menace.
 September 27 – Prime Minister Giovanni Giolitti visits the German Chancellor Bernhard von Bülow to allay concerns in Berlin by the French-Italian rapprochement in relation with the Triple Alliance.

November
 November 6 – First round of the Italian general election.
 November 13 – Second round of the Italian general election. The "ministerial" left-wing bloc of the Historical Left led by Giovanni Giolitti remains the largest in Parliament, winning 339 of the 508 seats. The papal ban on Catholics voting was relaxed for the first time, and three Catholics were elected.

Births
 February 3 – Luigi Dallapiccola, Italian composer (d. 1975)
 April 18 – Giuseppe Terragni, Italian Rationalist architect (d. 1943)
 August 28 – Secondo Campini, Italian jet pioneer (d. 1980)
 November 25 – Toni Ortelli, Italian composer and alpinist (d. 2000)

Deaths
Emilio Comba, Waldensian pastor and historian (b. 1839)
 February 12 – Antonio Labriola, Italian Marxist theoretician (b. 1843)

References

 Clark, Martin (2008). Modern Italy: 1871 to the present, Harlow: Pearson Education, 

 
Italy
Years of the 20th century in Italy